Toy Story is an American media franchise owned by The Walt Disney Company. The franchise centers around toys that, unknown to humans, are secretly living, sentient creatures. It began in 1995 with the release of the animated film of the same name, which focus on a diverse group of toys that feature a classic cowboy doll named Sheriff Woody and a modern spaceman action figure named Buzz Lightyear.

The Toy Story franchise consists mainly of five CGI-animated films: Toy Story (1995), Toy Story 2 (1999), Toy Story 3 (2010), Toy Story 4 (2019), and the spin-off prequel film within a film Lightyear (2022). A fifth film was recently announced. It also includes the 2D-animated direct-to-video spin-off film within a film Buzz Lightyear of Star Command: The Adventure Begins (2000) and the animated television series Buzz Lightyear of Star Command (2000–01). The first Toy Story was the first feature-length film to be made entirely using computer-generated imagery. The first two films were directed by John Lasseter, the third film by Lee Unkrich (who acted as co-director of the second film alongside Ash Brannon), the fourth film by Josh Cooley, and Lightyear by Angus MacLane.

Produced on a total budget of $720 million, the Toy Story films have grossed more than $3.3 billion worldwide, becoming the 19th highest-grossing franchise worldwide and the third highest-grossing animated franchise. Each film of the main series set box office records, with the third and fourth included in the top 50 all-time worldwide films. The franchise has received critical acclaim from critics and audiences. The first two films were re-released in theaters as a Disney Digital 3-D "double feature" for at least two weeks in October 2009 as a promotion for the then-upcoming third film.

Films

Main films

Toy Story (1995)

Toy Story, the first film in the franchise, was released on November 22, 1995. It was the first feature-length film created entirely by CGI and was directed by John Lasseter. The plot of the film involves Andy Davis (voiced by John Morris), an imaginative young boy, getting a new Buzz Lightyear (voiced by Tim Allen) action figure for his birthday, causing Sheriff Woody (voiced by Tom Hanks), a vintage cowboy doll, to think that he has been replaced as Andy's favorite toy. In competing for Andy's attention, Woody accidentally knocks Buzz out of a window, leading the other toys to believe he tried to murder Buzz. Determined to set things right, Woody tries to save Buzz and both must escape from the house of the next-door neighbor Sid Phillips (voiced by Erik von Detten), who likes to torture and destroy toys. In addition to Hanks and Allen, the film featured the voices of Jim Varney, Don Rickles, John Ratzenberger, Wallace Shawn, and Annie Potts. The film was critically and financially successful, grossing over $373 million worldwide. The film was later re-released in Disney Digital 3-D as part of a double feature, along with Toy Story 2, for a two-week run, which was later extended due to its financial success.

Toy Story 2 (1999)

Toy Story 2, the second film in the franchise, was released on November 24, 1999. Lasseter reprised his role as director. The film's plot involves Woody getting stolen by a greedy toy collector who is named Al McWhiggin (voiced by Wayne Knight). Buzz and several of Andy's toys set off to attempt to free Woody, who meanwhile has discovered his origins as a historic television star. In addition to the returning cast, Toy Story 2 included voice acting from Joan Cusack, Kelsey Grammer, Estelle Harris, and Jodi Benson. Toy Story 2 was not originally intended for release in theaters, but as a direct-to-video sequel to the original Toy Story, with a 60-minute running time. However, Disney's executives were impressed by the high quality of the in-work imagery for the sequel, and were also pressured by the main characters' voice actors Hanks and Allen, so they decided to convert Toy Story 2 into a theatrical film. It turned out to be an even greater success than the original Toy Story, grossing over $497 million worldwide. The film was re-released in Disney Digital 3-D as part of a double feature, along with Toy Story, on October 2, 2009.

Toy Story 3 (2010)

Toy Story 3, the third film in the franchise, was released on June 18, 2010, nearly 11 years after Toy Story 2. The plot focuses on the toys being accidentally dropped off at a daycare center while their owner, Andy, is getting ready to go to college. The toys discover that all of the toys are ruled by Lotso (voiced by Ned Beatty), a sinister teddy bear, while Woody finds potential hope for a new home in the hands of Bonnie, a toddler that takes great care of her toys. Blake Clark replaced Varney after Varney's death in 2000, while other new cast members included Michael Keaton, Timothy Dalton, Jeff Garlin, Kristen Schaal, and Bonnie Hunt. It was the first Toy Story film not to be directed by Lasseter (although he remained involved in the film as executive producer), but by Lee Unkrich, who edited the first two films and co-directed the second. It was Pixar's highest-grossing film of all time both domestically, surpassing Finding Nemo, until it was surpassed by Finding Dory in 2016 and worldwide, also surpassing Finding Nemo, until it was surpassed by Incredibles 2 in 2018. Toy Story 3 grossed more than the first and second films combined, making it the first animated film to have crossed the $1 billion mark. In August 2010, it surpassed Shrek 2, becoming the highest-grossing animated film of all time until it was surpassed by Frozen, another Disney production, in March 2014. The film was released on DVD and Blu-ray on November 2, 2010.

Toy Story 4 (2019)

Toy Story 4, the fourth feature film in the franchise, was released on June 21, 2019. Taking place not long after Toy Story 3, the story involves Woody, Buzz, and the other toys living well with their new owner Bonnie. On her first day of kindergarten, Bonnie creates a toy spork, named Forky (voiced by Tony Hale), out of garbage. Woody, having been neglected by Bonnie lately, personally takes it upon himself to keep Forky out of harm's way. During a road trip with Bonnie's family, Woody, to his delight encounters his old friend and former fellow toy Bo Peep (Annie Potts), who he had been separated from in the interim period between Toy Story 2 and Toy Story 3 and has to deal with fears of becoming a "lost toy". Rickles had died in 2017 prior to the production of the film, but Pixar used archival recordings from him to continue his voice work for the film. Additional new cast members include Keegan-Michael Key, Jordan Peele, Keanu Reeves, Ally Maki, and Christina Hendricks. The film had been originally announced on November 6, 2014 during an investor's call with Lasseter to direct, Galyn Susman to produce, with the screenplay written by Rashida Jones and Will McCormack based on the story developed by Lasseter, Andrew Stanton, Pete Docter, and Lee Unkrich. However, during production, Lasseter stepped down from his position at Pixar in 2017, though remained to consult for the film; Josh Cooley was named as the film's director, with Jonas Rivera replacing Susman as producer. The film underwent a major revision following the departures of Jones and McCormack later in 2017, with Stephany Folsom replacing them as screenwriter. Much of the original script by Jones and McCormack had to be dropped, delaying the release of the film.

Untitled fifth Toy Story film

In February 2019, Tim Allen, who voiced Buzz Lightyear in the Toy Story films, expressed interest in doing another film as he "did not see any reason why they would not do it." On The Ellen DeGeneres Show that May, Hanks said that Toy Story 4 would be the final installment in the franchise, but producer Mark Nielsen disclosed a possibility of a fifth film, as Pixar was not ruling out that possibility. In February 2023, Disney CEO Bob Iger announced that the franchise would continue with a fifth film, while Allen confirmed his return as the voice of Buzz.

Buzz Lightyear films

Buzz Lightyear of Star Command: The Adventure Begins (2000)

Buzz Lightyear of Star Command: The Adventure Begins is a 2000 traditionally animated direct-to-video television film produced by Walt Disney Television Animation with Pixar Animation Studios as a co-production that serves as a spin-off of the Toy Story franchise. The film was released on August 8, 2000 and features Tim Allen as the voice of Buzz Lightyear. The film follows Buzz Lightyear as a space ranger who fights against the evil Emperor Zurg, showing the inspiration for the Buzz Lightyear toyline that exists in the Toy Story series. The film later led to the television series, Buzz Lightyear of Star Command. Although the film was criticized for not using the same animation in the Toy Story films, it sold three million VHS and DVDs in its first week of release.

Lightyear (2022)

At Disney's 2020 Investor Day meeting in December, Lightyear was announced as a spin-off film that depicts the in-universe origin story of the fictional human Buzz Lightyear character who inspired the toy that appeared in the main films, with Chris Evans cast in the title role. Directed by Angus MacLane, the film was released on June 17, 2022.

Television series

Toy Story Treats (1996)
In 1996, a series of shorts known as Toy Story Treats were created as interstitials on ABC Saturday Morning, the predecessor to Disney's One Saturday Morning and ABC Kids. They did not necessarily follow the continuity from Toy Story, taking place before, during and after the events of the first film. They were aired roughly around the time of Toy Story release to home video. The shorts also appeared as bonus features on both "The Ultimate Toy Box" and as Easter eggs on the "10th Anniversary Edition" DVD menu of the first film, they were also restored in HD in a 1.33:1 aspect ratio and presented in the special features of the 2010 Blu-ray release of the film. John Ratzenberger, Wallace Shawn,  and Jeff Pidgeon reprise their roles from the film as Hamm, Rex, and the Aliens, respectively, with Jim Hanks and Pat Fraley voicing Woody and Buzz, replacing Tom Hanks and Tim Allen who previously voiced the characters.

Buzz Lightyear of Star Command (2000–2001)

Buzz Lightyear of Star Command is an animated television series produced by Walt Disney Television Animation and co-produced by  Pixar Animation Studios that is a spin-off of the Toy Story franchise, and was led from the direct-to-video film Buzz Lightyear of Star Command: The Adventure Begins, depicting the in-universe Toy Story series on which the Buzz Lightyear toy is based. The series takes place in the far future, featuring Buzz Lightyear voiced by Patrick Warburton (replacing Tim Allen), a famous, experienced Space Ranger who takes a crew of rookies under his wing as he investigates criminal activity across the galaxy and attempts to bring down Evil Emperor Zurg once and for all. It aired on UPN from October 2, 2000 to November 29, 2000 and on ABC from October 14, 2000 to January 13, 2001.

Toy Story Toons (2011–2012)

In 2011, Pixar started releasing short animated films to supplement the Toy Story films, called Toy Story Toons. The shorts pick up where Toy Story 3 has left off, with Woody, Buzz, and Andy's other toys finding a new home at Bonnie's. So far, three shorts have been released; Hawaiian Vacation, Small Fry, and Partysaurus Rex. Another short, titled Mythic Rock, was in development in 2013, but was never released.

Forky Asks a Question (2019–2020)

A series of shorts named Forky Asks a Question for Disney+, with the new character Forky from Toy Story 4 (voiced by Tony Hale), was released on the launch date of the service on November 12, 2019.

Pixar Popcorn (2021)
There are two Toy Story shorts in this series of one minute shorts titled Pixar Popcorn, which was released on January 22, 2021 on Disney+. The shorts are Fluffy Stuff with Ducky and Bunny: Love, and Fluffy Stuff with Ducky and Bunny: Three Heads.

Television specials
Pixar has also developed two 22-minute Toy Story television specials for ABC. They also air them on Disney Channel, Disney XD, and Disney Junior.

Toy Story of Terror! (2013)

The first was a Halloween-themed special titled Toy Story of Terror!, aired on October 16, 2013.

Toy Story That Time Forgot (2014)

The second was a Christmas-themed special titled Toy Story That Time Forgot, aired on December 2, 2014.

Short films

Lamp Life (2020)
Lamp Life is a short film revealing Bo Peep's whereabouts between the events of Toy Story 2 and Toy Story 4, where she was used as a night light for first one and then two children before being donated to the antique shop, where she and her sheep eventually abandoned their home lamp and were reunited with Woody. It was released on Disney+  on January 31, 2020.

Valerie LaPointe, who was a story supervisor for Toy Story 4, wrote and directed the short film. Annie Potts and Ali Maki returned as Bo Peep and Giggle McDimples. However, Woody is voiced by Jim Hanks.

Pixar Popcorn (2021)
There is one other Toy Story short in this series of one minute shorts titled Pixar Popcorn, which was released on January 22, 2021 on Disney+. The short is To Fitness and Beyond.

Reception

Box office performance
Toy Storys first five days of domestic release (on Thanksgiving weekend), earned the film $39.1 million. The film placed first in the weekend's box office with $29.1 million, and maintained its number one position at the domestic box office for the following two weekends. It was the highest-grossing domestic film in 1995, and the third-highest-grossing animated film at the time.

Toy Story 2 opened at No. 1 over the Thanksgiving Day weekend, with a three-day tally of $57.4 million from 3,236 theaters. It averaged $17,734 per theater over three days during that weekend, and stayed at No. 1 for the next two weekends. It was the third-highest-grossing film of 1999.

Toy Story 3 had a strong debut, opening in 4,028 theaters and grossing $41.1 million at the box office on its opening day. In addition, Toy Story 3 had the highest opening-day gross for an animated film on record. During its opening weekend, the film grossed $110.3 million, making it #1 for the weekend; it was the biggest opening weekend ever for any Pixar film. Toy Story 3 stayed at the #1 spot for the next weekend. The film had the second-highest opening ever for an animated film at the time. It was the highest-grossing film of 2010, both domestically and worldwide. Toy Story 3 grossed over $1 billion, making it the seventh film in history, the second Disney film in 2010, and the first animated film to do so.

Toy Story 4 achieved the biggest opening for the series and the biggest for a G-rated film, grossing $120.9 million domestically and $244.5 internationally in its first weekend. It went on to gross $1.073 billion, becoming the 43rd movie ever to cross the billion dollar mark and was the eighth-highest-grossing film of 2019.

Lightyear underperformed at the global box office, grossing a total of $226.4 million. Its first weekend gross totaled $85.2 million, underperforming expectations, attributed by observers to a lackluster audience turnout due multiple factors including the COVID-19 pandemic, the release of past Pixar films Soul, Luca, and Turning Red on Disney+, and its more mixed reviews when compared to other films in the franchise.

Critical and public response

According to Rotten Tomatoes, the Toy Story franchise is the most critically acclaimed franchise of all time. The first two films received a 100% "Certified Fresh" rating, while the third and fourth earned 98% and 97% "Certified Fresh" ratings. According to the site, no other franchise has had all of its films so highly rated—the Before trilogy comes closest with 98%, and the Dollars trilogy and The Lord of the Rings trilogy come after with average ratings of 95% and 94%, respectively, while the Toy Story franchise has an average of 99%.

According to Metacritic, the Toy Story franchise is the second most critically acclaimed franchise of all time, after The Lord of the Rings trilogy, having an average rounded score of 90 out of 100.

Accolades

Toy Story was nominated for three Academy Awards, including Best Original Screenplay, Best Original Score and Best Original Song for Randy Newman's "You've Got a Friend in Me." John Lasseter, the director of the film, also received a Special Achievement Award for "the development and inspired application of techniques that have made possible the first feature-length computer-animated film." Toy Story was also the first animated film to be nominated for the Academy Award for Best Original Screenplay. At the 53rd Golden Globe Awards, Toy Story earned two Golden Globe nominations—Best Motion Picture – Musical or Comedy and Best Original Song. It was also nominated for Best Special Visual Effects at the 50th British Academy Film Awards.

Toy Story 2 won a Golden Globe for Best Motion Picture – Musical or Comedy and earned a single Academy Award nomination for the song "When She Loved Me," performed by Sarah McLachlan. The Academy Award for Best Animated Feature was introduced in 2001 after the first two Toy Story installments.

Toy Story 3 won two Academy Awards – Best Animated Feature and Best Original Song for "We Belong Together". It earned three other nominations, including Best Picture, Best Adapted Screenplay, and Best Sound Editing. It was the third animated film in history to be nominated for Best Picture, after Beauty and the Beast and Up. Toy Story 3 also won the Golden Globe for Best Animated Feature Film and the award for Best Animated Film at the British Academy Film Awards.

Toy Story 4 won the Academy Award for Best Animated Feature and was also nominated for Best Original Song for Newman's "I Can't Let You Throw Yourself Away." It is the first animated franchise to win Best Animated Feature award twice. It's also the first animated franchise to have every film nominated in the same category (Original Song). It was also nominated to the Golden Globe for Best Animated Feature Film (but lost against Missing Link) and nominated for Best Animated Film at the British Academy Film Awards.

Cast and characters

Crew

Other media

Comic books
 A 4-issue limited series Toy Story: Mysterious Stranger was published by Boom! Entertainment from May to August 2009. This was followed by an 8-issue ongoing series, starting with #0 in November 2009. Two Buzz Lightyear one-shots were released in 2010, for Free Comic Book Day and Halloween. A second 4-issue limited series, Toy Story: Toy Overboard was published by Boom! Entertainment from July to October 2010.
 A 4-issue limited series by Marvel Comics Toy Story: Tales from the Toy Chest was published from May to August 2012.
 Toy Story magazine was first released on July 21, 2010. Each edition was 24 pages in length, apart from the launch edition, which was 28 pages.
 A one-shot anthology comic book by Dark Horse Comics was released to tie in with Toy Story 4 in 2019. The comic picks up just after the events of the film, also exploring the backstories of Duke Caboom, Ducky, Bunny, Bo Peep and Giggle McDimples during their exploits as a band of lost toys.

Video games
 Toy Story (1995) (Sega Genesis, Super Nintendo Entertainment System, Microsoft Windows, and Game Boy)
 Disney's Activity Center: Toy Story (1996) (Microsoft Windows)
 Disney's Animated Storybook: Toy Story (1996) (Microsoft Windows and macOS)
 Disney's Activity Center: Toy Story 2 (2000) (Microsoft Windows)
 Toy Story 2: Buzz Lightyear to the Rescue (1999) (Dreamcast, PlayStation, Nintendo 64, Microsoft Windows, macOS, and Game Boy Color)
 Toy Story 2: Woody Sousaku Daisakusen!! (2000) (Sega Pico) – released only in Japan
 Buzz Lightyear of Star Command (2000) (Game Boy Color, PlayStation, Dreamcast, and Microsoft Windows)
 Jessie's Wild West Rodeo (2001) (Microsoft Windows and macOS)
 Toy Story Racer (2001) (PlayStation and Game Boy Color)
 Disney Hotshots: Toy Story 2 (2003) (Microsoft Windows)
 Toy Story 2: Operation Rescue Woody! (2005) (V.Smile)
 Toy Story Mania! (2009) (Wii, Microsoft Windows, Xbox 360, and PlayStation 3).
 Disney•Pixar Toy Story 3 (2010) (LeapPad, LeapPad2, LeapPad3, LeapPad Platinum, LeapPad Ultra, LeapPad Jr., Leapster Explorer, and LeapsterGS Explorer)
 Toy Story 3: The Video Game (2010) (PlayStation 2, PlayStation 3, Xbox 360, Wii, PlayStation Portable, Nintendo DS, Microsoft Windows, macOS, and iOS)
 Shooting Beena: Toy Story 3 – Woody to Buzz no Daibōken! (2010) (Advanced Pico Beena) – released only in Japan
 Toy Story: Smash It! (2013) (iOS and Android)
 Toy Story Drop! (2019) (iOS and Android)

Games featuring Toy Story characters
 Disney Learning: 1st Grade (2000) (Microsoft Windows and macOS)
 Disney Learning: 2nd Grade (2000) (Microsoft Windows and macOS)
 Disney•Pixar Learning: 1st Grade (2002) (Microsoft Windows and macOS)
 Disney•Pixar Learning: 2nd and 3rd Grade (2002) (Microsoft Windows and macOS)
 Disney's Extreme Skate Adventure (2003) (Game Boy Advance, PlayStation 2, Xbox, and GameCube)
 LittleBigPlanet 2 (2011) (PlayStation 3)
 Disney•Pixar Pixar Pals (2011) (LeapPad, LeapPad2, LeapPad3, LeapPad Platinum, LeapPad Ultra, LeapPad Jr., Leapster Explorer, and LeapsterGS Explorer)
 Kinect: Disneyland Adventures (2011) (Xbox 360, Xbox One, and Microsoft Windows)
 Kinect Rush: A Disney•Pixar Adventure (2012) (Xbox 360, Xbox One, and Microsoft Windows)
 Disney Infinity (2013) (PlayStation 3, Xbox 360, Wii, Wii U, Nintendo 3DS, Microsoft Windows, iOS, and Apple TV)
 Disney Magic Kingdoms (2016) (mobile)
 Disney Heroes: Battle Mode (2018) (mobile)
 Lego The Incredibles (2018) (PlayStation 4, Xbox One, Nintendo Switch, Microsoft Windows, and macOS)
 Kingdom Hearts III (2019) (PlayStation 4 and Xbox One)

Pixar created some original animations for the games, including fully animated sequences for PC titles.

Woody and Buzz Lightyear were originally going to appear in the Final Mix version of the Disney/Square Enix video game Kingdom Hearts II. They were omitted from the final product, but their models appear in the game's coding, without textures. The director of the Kingdom Hearts series, Tetsuya Nomura, stated that he would like to include Pixar property in future Kingdom Hearts games, given Disney's purchase of Pixar. This eventually came true, as a stage based on Toy Story made its debut appearance in the series in Kingdom Hearts III, marking the first time that Pixar-based content appears in the series, along with Monsters, Inc. and Ratatouille. In the Toy Box campaign, Woody, Buzz, Hamm, Rex, LGM's, Sarge and the Green Army Men are transported to a alternate world where most of the humans don't exist and is home to a business call "Galaxy Toys", it also somehow let's Buzz's blaster to actually shoot real lasers.

Merchandising and software
Toy Story had a large promotion before its release, leading to numerous tie-ins with the film including images on food packaging. A variety of merchandise was released during the film's theatrical run and its initial VHS release including toys, clothing, and shoes, among other things. When action figures for Buzz Lightyear and Sheriff Woody were created, they were initially ignored by retailers. However, after over 250,000 figures were sold for each character before the film's release, demand continued to expand, eventually reaching over 25 million units sold by 2007. Also, Disney's Animated Storybook: Toy Story and Disney's Activity Center: Toy Story were released for Windows and Mac. Disney's Animated Storybook: Toy Story was the best selling software title of 1996, selling over 500,000 copies.

Theme park attractions
 Buzz Lightyear's Space Ranger Spin in many Disney Parks.
 Toy Story Mania! at Disney's Hollywood Studios at the Walt Disney World Resort, Disney California Adventure at the Disneyland Resort and Tokyo DisneySea at Tokyo Disney Resort.
 Toy Story Land themed lands at Walt Disney Studios Park, Hong Kong Disneyland, Shanghai Disneyland and Disney's Hollywood Studios.
 Toy Story: The Musical on Disney Cruise Line's ship Disney Wonder.
 Totally Toy Story, an "instant theme park" then a theme area in Tomorrowland at Disneyland.

Totally Toy Story

Totally Toy Story was an instant theme park and a promotional event for the Toy Story film premiere held at El Capitan Theatre and Masonic Convention Hall.

For the November 18, 1995 Toy Story premiere at El Capitan Theatre, Disney rented the Masonic Convention Hall, the next door building, for Totally Toy Story, an instant theme park and a promotional event for the movie. Movie goers paid an additional fee for the pop up park. The promotional event had pre-sales over $1 million and remained opened until January 1, 1996. The Toy Story Funhouse part was moved to Disneyland's Tomorrowland and opened there on January 27, 1996 and closed on May 27, 1996.

Totally Toy Story, while in Hollywood, consisted of "Toy Story Art of Animation" exhibit in El Capitan's basement and the Toy Story Funhouse at the convention hall. The fun house consisted of 30,000 square feet of various attractions. These attractions continue the story of the movie with the toys life-size.

Attractions
Toy Story Funhouse attractions:
 Hamm's Theater – "Hamm's All-Doll Revue" has energetic dancing and original songs lasted 20 minutes
 Buzz's Galaxy –
 "Buzz & the Buzz Lites" show included music from Frank Sinatra
 two arcade-style games, "Whack-A-Alien"
 a motion-simulator ride
 Woody's Roundup dance hall, live musicians and country line-dancing lessons
 Pizza Planet restaurant
 Green Army Men's obstacle course, participants strap on foot base to tackle the course
 Mr. Potato Head's Playroom, contained Etch-a-Sketches and other dexterity games had a floor made up of old game boards
 Totally Interactive Room, had Sega and Nintendo Toy Story' games
 Souvenir shop

ImpactToy Story innovative computer animation had a large impact on the film industry. After the film's debut, various industries were interested in the technology used for the film. Graphics chip makers desired to compute imagery similar to the film's animation for personal computers; game developers wanted to learn how to replicate the animation for video games; and robotics researchers were interested in building artificial intelligence into their machines that compared to the lifelike characters in the film. Various authors have also compared the film to an interpretation of Don Quixote as well as humanism. The free and open-source Linux distribution Debian takes its codenames from Toy Story characters, the tradition of which came about as Bruce Perens was involved in the early development of Debian while working at Pixar.

Gromit Unleashed
In 2013, Pixar designed a "Gromit Lightyear" sculpture based on the Aardman Animations character Gromit from Wallace and Gromit for Gromit Unleashed which sold for £65,000.

To infinity and beyond!
Buzz Lightyear's classic line "To infinity and beyond!" has seen usage not only on T-shirts, but among philosophers and mathematical theorists as well. Lucia Hall of The Humanist linked the film's plot to an interpretation of humanism. She compared the phrase to "All this and heaven, too!", indicating one who is happy with a life on Earth as well as having an afterlife. In 2008, during STS-124, astronauts took an action figure of Buzz Lightyear into space on the Discovery Space Shuttle as part of an educational experience for students that also stressed the catchphrase. The action figure was used for experiments in zero-g. Also, in 2008, the phrase made international news when it was reported that a father and son had continually repeated the phrase to help them keep track of each other while treading water for 15 hours in the Atlantic Ocean.

 Internet fandom live-action remake Live Action Toy Story'' is a 2012 comedy-adventure fan film produced by the Arizona-based Jonason Pauley and Jesse Perrotta; it is a shot-by-shot recreation of the 1995 computer-animated film of the same name, with the toy characters animated through stop-motion or filmed moving with wires and strings.

Notes

References

External links

  at Disney

 
Film series introduced in 1995
Animated film series
Pixar franchises
Mass media franchises
Children's film series
Films about sentient toys
Children's comedy-drama films
American children's animated adventure films
Sentient toys in fiction
Films adapted into television shows